This article shows all participating team squads at the 2009 Women's NORCECA Volleyball Championship, held from September 22 to September 27, 2009 in Bayamón, Puerto Rico.

Head Coach: Arnd Ludwig

Head Coach: Braulio Godínez

Head Coach: Luis Oviedo

Head Coach: Marcos Kwiek

Head Coach: Samuel Cibrián

Head Coach: Carlos Cardona

Head Coach: Francisco Cruz Jimenez

Head Coach: Hugh McCutcheon

References 
 NORCECA

N
N